Charles R. Poliquin (March 5, 1961 – September 26, 2018) was a Canadian strength coach. He was also the author of eight books.

Early life and education
Charles Poliquin was born on March 5, 1961, in Ottawa, Ontario, Canada and started strength training at an early age. He earned a master's degree in exercise physiology.

Career
Poliquin began working as a strength coach while he was in graduate school in Canada. He helped popularize German Volume Training. In the late 1990s, Poliquin founded Poliquin Performance, opening the first Poliquin Performance Center in Phoenix, Arizona in 2001, and the Poliquin Strength Institute in East Greenwich, Rhode Island, in 2009. Throughout this time he certified coaches in the Poliquin International Certification Program (PICP), which includes a body hormone profiling method, which he invented, called BioSignature Modulation. In September 2013 Poliquin parted ways with Poliquin Performance (now renamed Poliquin Group). He subsequently founded another fitness company called Strength Sensei. He trained numerous Olympic and professional athletes.

Poliquin published articles in peer-reviewed journals of exercise science and strength and conditioning. His training theories were introduced to the bodybuilding community in 1993 through his articles for Muscle Media 2000 magazine, and after 1998 through the online and print versions of Testosterone Magazine (now known as T-Nation). He coined the phrase "the myth of discipline" to suggest that fitness results depend on how motivated a gym-goer is. As a columnist, he penned over 600 articles in numerous publications. Additionally, he is the author of eight books, many of which have been translated into 12 different languages, including Swedish, German, French, Italian, Dutch, and Japanese. His first book, The Poliquin Principles formatted a basic summary of his training methods and provided insight into the training regimens of some of the world's top athletes.  Poliquin has a chapter giving advice in Tim Ferriss' book Tools of Titans.

Death
Poliquin died on September 26, 2018, at the age of 57. The cause of death was not officially stated. A tribute to Poliquin on a weightlifting website to which he was a contributor indicated he died of a heart attack. Friend and former client Gary Roberts  stated, “He lost his father early to a genetic heart disease. He knew he had this in his family. He had a heart attack previously, so he was on top of his nutrition as a result. I knew that was a concern for him.”

Poliquin was survived by his daughter.

Selected list of trainees
Helen Maroulis, first American female wrestler to win an Olympic gold medal 
 David Boston, NFL Pro Bowl wide receiver
 Al MacInnis, Retired NHL defenseman, Norris Trophy winner
 Joe Nieuwendyk, Florida Panthers, Conn Smythe Trophy winner, Stanley Cup winner
 Chris Pronger, Anaheim Ducks, Stanley Cup winner; winner of Norris and Hart Trophies
 Connor Dunlop, Bradshaw Cup Winner
 Canadian short-track speed-skating team
 Dwight Phillips, Olympic Gold Medalist long jumper
 Nanceen Perry, World Record Holder 4 x 200 metre
 Michelle Freeman, former number 1 ranked hurdler in the World.
 Chris Thorpe, Olympic Silver & Bronze Medalist, Double's Luge
 Adam Nelson, World Champion & Olympic Gold Medalist, Shot Put
 Ben Pakulski, Top Canadian Bodybuilder and Trainer
 Gary Roberts, NHL player—Roberts credits Poliquin with having helped him make a successful return to the NHL after 2 of his previous return attempts failed due to physical injury.

Books
 The Poliquin Principles - 1997, 2006
 The German Body Comp Program - 1997, 2005
 Manly Weight Loss - 1998
 Modern Trends in Strength Training - 2000, 2001, 2005
 Winning the Arms Race - 2000, 2001, 2005
 Applied Strongman Training for Sport (with co-author Art McDermott) - 2006
 Ask Coach Poliquin (Volumes I and II) - 2006
 ''Arm Size and Strength: The Ultimate Guide - 2015

References

External links
 
 Charles Poliquin Seminar Experience

1961 births
2018 deaths
Canadian non-fiction writers
Franco-Ontarian people
Writers from Ottawa
Strength and conditioning coaches